Anterolateral may refer to:

 Anterolateral central arteries
 Anterolateral ligament
 Anterolateral ganglionic branches
 Anterolateral sulcus of medulla
 Anterolateral sulcus of spinal cord
 Anterolateral system